Edgerley Halt railway station was a station to the southeast of Kinnerley, Shropshire, England. The station was opened in 1927 and closed in 1933.

References

Further reading

Disused railway stations in Shropshire
Railway stations in Great Britain opened in 1927
Railway stations in Great Britain closed in 1933